Presley Carson Wood (born 20 July 1968) is a Honduran former football player,

Club career
Born in Roatán, Carson played almost 100 matches for F.C. Motagua over six years before joining Victoria in 1998. A year later he moved to Federal.

International career
Carson made his debut for Honduras in a March 1995 friendly match against Brazil in which game he immediately scored his first international goal and has earned a total of 5 caps, scoring 3 goals. He has represented his country at the 1996 CONCACAF Gold Cup and was a non-playing squad member at the 1998 CONCACAF Gold Cup.

His final international was a January 1998 friendly match against Costa Rica, scoring a third international goal.

International goals
Scores and results list Honduras' goal tally first.

References

External links

1968 births
Living people
People from Roatán
Association football forwards
Honduran footballers
Honduras international footballers
1996 CONCACAF Gold Cup players
1998 CONCACAF Gold Cup players
Platense F.C. players
F.C. Motagua players
C.D. Victoria players
C.D. Federal players
Liga Nacional de Fútbol Profesional de Honduras players